Tuldila (458), was a Hun leader in Majorian's army.

History
In early 458, Western Roman Emperor Majorian gathered a vast army formed by barbarian tribes, including Chunus, for the campaign against the Vandals. Sidonius Apollinaris recounts: 

This account refers to the loss of Ellac and other chieftains, the Battle of Nedao was fought only few years before, and they withdrawn from the Danube, now occupied by former Germanic subjects. Those Huns were situated in Moesia Superior and Dacia Ripensis.

Etymology
Tuldila's, like the name of Tulan Qaghan (Τουλδίχ; 580s) of the Göktürks, derives from Turkic *tuld (composed of uld or ult, see Uldin), and diminutive suffix in/ach (+q, +k) ie. Germanic diminutive suffix -ila.

References

Sources
 

Hun military leaders
Western Roman people of Hunnic descent
5th-century monarchs in Europe